Milton Ruben Young (December 6, 1897 – May 31, 1983) was an American politician, most notable for representing North Dakota in the United States Senate from 1945 until 1981. At the time of his retirement, he was the most senior Republican in the Senate.

Early life

Born at Berlin, North Dakota to John and Rachel Young, all four of his grandparents were from Germany. Young graduated from LaMoure High School, then attended North Dakota State University in Fargo and Graceland College.  After college, Young returned home to operate the farm of his parents, John and Rachel Zimmerman Young. In 1919, Young married Malinda Benson and together they had three sons, Wendell, Duane, and John.

Political career (North Dakota)

Young became increasingly interested in politics during the depression and drought of the late 1920s and 1930s.  He was active in community affairs, serving on the school, township, and county Agricultural Adjustment Act (AAA) boards.   He stood for election to the North Dakota House of Representatives in 1932; he won, and was then elected to the state Senate just two years later. Young was also one of the key persons in developing the Republican Organizing Committee in North Dakota during the 1940s.

Political career (Washington)

With the death of John Moses in 1945, Governor Fred G. Aandahl appointed Young to fill the vacant U.S. Senate seat, and Young was forced to relinquish management of the family farm, in order to fulfill his duties in Washington.

For the 1952 Presidential election, Young initially indicated his support for Ohio Senator Robert Taft. In March, Young endorsed Democratic Senator Richard Russell Jr. for the presidency, citing him as "superbly qualified" for the position and stated his willingness to support him in the event that he was nominated by his party. The endorsement caused a sensation and left Republicans from his home state calling for his withdrawal from the party.

Young spent the remainder of his career in the Senate, becoming one of the longest-serving members of the Senate in its history. His major committee assignments were on the Agriculture, Nutrition, and Forestry committee, and the Appropriations committee of which he was the ranking Republican member. Young voted in favor of the Civil Rights Acts of 1957, 1960, 1964, and 1968, as well as the Voting Rights Act of 1965 and the confirmation of Thurgood Marshall to the U.S. Supreme Court, but did not vote on the 24th Amendment to the U.S. Constitution. In 1974, during his last election for the U.S. Senate, Young's age was being used against him during the General election; Young aired campaign commercials showing himself breaking a piece of board with a karate chop and won re-election.

As a result of the 1980 elections, Republicans won control of the Senate. As the longest-serving Republican Senator, Young would have been in line to become President pro tempore. However, he had chosen to retire instead of running for a seventh term. In deference to his long service in the body, he was elected President pro tempore by the lame duck Democratic-controlled Senate on December 5 and served for one day.

Later personal life

Young's first wife died shortly before their golden anniversary in 1969. Young's second wife was Patricia Byrne, his secretary in the Senate, of Bowman, North Dakota.

Senator Young died at his retirement home in Sun City, Arizona on May 31, 1983, and was buried at Berlin, North Dakota. The Milton R. Young Power Plant in Oliver County was named in his honor. The tallest building in Minot is a public housing facility which bears his name.

See also
 1956 United States Senate election in North Dakota
 1962 United States Senate election in North Dakota
 1968 United States Senate election in North Dakota
 1974 United States Senate election in North Dakota

References

External links

 Exhibit of Milton Young
 Milton Young Papers at The University of North Dakota
 

|-

|-

|-

|-

1897 births
1983 deaths
20th-century American politicians
American members of the Community of Christ
American people of German descent
Graceland University alumni
Republican Party members of the North Dakota House of Representatives
Presidents pro tempore of the North Dakota Senate
Republican Party North Dakota state senators
North Dakota State University alumni
People from LaMoure County, North Dakota
People from Sun City, Arizona
Presidents pro tempore of the United States Senate
Republican Party United States senators from North Dakota